Dead Flowerz is the fifth studio album by Esham. Released in 1996, it peaked at #38 on the Billboard Top R&B/Hip-Hop Albums chart.

Track listing
All tracks by Esham

"What"  – 2:34
"You Betta Ask Somebody"  – 3:22
"Tony Montana"  – 1:48
"Kill or Be Killed"  – 3:46
"What Did I Do Wrong"  – 3:35
"Foodstamp"  – 3:15
"Any Style You Want"  – 3:48
"Killagram"  – 3:18
"One Day"  – 4:28
"Fried Chicken"  – 2:31
"Because"  – 3:54
"Black Orchid"  – 4:38
"Trick Wit Me"  – 3:43
"If I Can't Have U"  – 2:30
"Hold U Up"  – 3:01
"U Ain't Fresh"  – 2:21
"Charlie Manson"  – 2:40
"Silicone"  – 3:56
"Wit Yo Punk Azz" (featuring Dice, Bugz, and Drunken Master) – 2:04
"Where All My Nigz At" (featuring Dice and Razzaq) – 2:50

Personnel
Esham - performer
Zelah Williams - background vocals
Dice - guest performer
Bugz - guest performer
Drunken Master - guest performer

Production
Producer: Esham
Producer: Lord Maji
Programming: Esham
Programming: Lord Maji
Arranger: Esham
Liner notes: Esham

References

Albums produced by Esham
Esham albums
1996 albums
Reel Life Productions albums